Cuneiform is one of the earliest systems of writing, emerging in Sumer in the late fourth millennium BC.

Archaic versions of cuneiform writing, including the Ur III (and earlier, ED III cuneiform of literature such as the Barton Cylinder) are not included due to extreme complexity of arranging them consistently and unequivocally by the shape of their signs; see Early Dynastic Cuneiform for the Unicode block.

The columns within the list contain:
MesZL: Sign index in Rykle Borger's (2004) Mesopotamisches Zeichenlexikon.
ŠL/HA: Sign index in Deimel's Šumerisches Lexikon (ŠL), completed and accommodated in Ellermeier and Studt's Handbuch Assur (HA).
aBZL: Sign index in Mittermayer's (2006) Altbabylonische Zeichenliste der sumerisch-literarischen Texte.
HethZL: Sign index in Rüster and Neu's (1989) Hethitisches Zeichenlexikon.
 Sign name according to MesZL, HA etc.
 Unicode code point. In the case of composite signs without a single dedicated code point, a sequence of the constituent signs' code points, joined by an ampersand ("&").
 Corresponding Unicode character name(s) as per Unicode 5.0 cuneiform encoding standard, in some cases departing from those typically encountered in the literature.
 Any further comments.

In MesZL, signs are sorted by their leftmost parts, beginning with horizontal strokes (single AŠ, then stacked TAB, EŠ16), followed by the diagonals GE23 and GE22, the Winkelhaken U and finally the vertical DIŠ. The relevant shape for the classification of a sign is the Neo-Assyrian one (after ca. 1000 BC); the standardization of sign shapes of this late period allows systematic arrangement by shape.

At Sumerisches-Glossar.de the complete sign list as PDF with all cuneiform signs and with an introduction by Rykle Borger is to be found.

AŠ

TAB (two AŠ)

EŠ16 (three AŠ)

GE23 (DIŠ-tenû)

U

DIŠ

See also
 Liste der archaischen Keilschriftzeichen
 Unicode cuneiform

References

Citations

Bibliography
 R. Borger, Assyrisch-Babylonische Zeichenliste, 2nd ed., Neukirchen-Vluyn (1981).
 R. Borger, Mesopotamisches Zeichenlexikon, Münster (2004). 
 A. Deimel, Šumerisches Lexikon, Rom (1928ff.).
 F. Ellermeier, M. Studt, Sumerisches Glossar Band 3 Teil 6: Handbuch Assur mit CD-ROM, Ausgabe für PC., Hardegsen (2003). 
I. J. Gelb, Old Akkadian Writing and Grammar, "Sign List of the Sargonic Period" (1952, 2nd ed. 1961), 218–235.
 Y. Gong, Die Namen der Keilschriftzeichen, AOAT 268, Münster (2000).
 M. Krebernik, Mesopotamien, at: P. Attinger, M. Wäfler Orbis Biblicus et Orientalis (OBO) 160/1, Fribourg and Göttingen (1998).
 C. Mittermayer, P. Attinger, Altbabylonische Zeichenliste der sumerisch-literarischen Texte, Fribourg (2006).
 Chr. Rüster, E. Neu, Hethitisches Zeichenlexikon, Wiesbaden (1989).

External links 
sign list at sumerisches-Glossar.de  PDF file of the complete sign list with Neo-Assyrian glyphs by M. Studt, with an introduction by  R. Borger.
 Unicode 5.0 Cuneiform
 Unicode 5.0 Cuneiform Numbers
 The OCHRE Signary: a sign list searchable by sign name or value, produced by the OCHRE Data Service of the Oriental Institute of the University of Chicago.
 CDLI online sign lists
 ETCSL sign list
 ePSD (electronic Pennsylvania Sumerian Dictionary)
 As sign list by Assyriologist Kateřina Šašková, featuring Ur III and Neo-Assyrian cuneiform shapes

Cuneiform